Udell Harrison Stallings (May 27, 1899  – after March 1966) was an American college football and baseball player and coach. He served as the co-head football coach with Lawrence McPhee at Oberlin College from 1922 to 1923 and the head football coach at Stevens Institute of Technology in 1924.  He was also the head baseball coach at Stevens Tech from 1927 to 1928, tallying a mark of 8–14.  Stallings was the athletic director at Newark Academy in Livingston, New Jersey from 1936 until his retirement in 1966.

His sister was concert singer Louise Stallings.

References

1899 births
Year of death missing
American football tackles
Oberlin Yeomen football coaches
Oberlin Yeomen football players
Stevens Tech Ducks baseball coaches
Stevens Tech Ducks football coaches
People from Madison County, Illinois